NA, N.A., Na, nA or n/a may refer to:

Chemistry and physics
 Sodium, symbol Na, a chemical element
 Avogadro constant (NA)
 Nucleophilic addition, a type of reaction in organic chemistry
 Numerical aperture, a number that characterizes a range of angles in an optical system
 nA, the symbol for nanoampere
 Naturally aspirated engine

Biology and medicine
 Na (tree) or Mesua ferrea, a species of tree native to Sri Lanka
 Neuroacanthocytosis, a neurological condition
 Nomina Anatomica, a former international standard for human anatomical nomenclature
 Noradrenaline, a hormone
 Nucleic acid analogue, compounds analogous to naturally occurring RNA and DNA

Places

Current
 Namibia (ISO country code)
 Naples (car number plate code: NA), Italy
 North America, a continent
 North Africa, a subcontinent

Historical
 Netherlands Antilles (former international vehicle registration code: NA)
 Na (Chinese state), a small state of the Chinese Zhou dynasty from the 11th to 8th centuries BC
 Nakoku, or Na, a state in Kyūshū, Japan from the 1st to early 3rd centuries AD

Names and titles
 Na (羅), a Korean surname related to the Chinese surname Luo
 Na, a particle used in Thai noble names
 National Academician, a member of the National Academy of Design

Art and entertainment
 Na (drum), a drum played by Tibetan shamans
 Nahal, Shine's pet Bengal tiger on the Nick Jr. TV show Shimmer and Shine
 New adult fiction, fiction marketed to people 18–30 years old
 Virgin New Adventures, a series of Doctor Who novels

Transport
 NA, the tailcode of VFA-94
 Nepal Airlines, the national flag carrier airline of Nepal
 North American Airlines (IATA code: NA)
 Naturally aspirated engine
 NA MX-5 Miata, the first generation of the Mazda Miata

Language
 Na (cuneiform), a cuneiform sign
 Na (Javanese) (ꦤ), a letter in the Javanese script
 Na (kana), a Japanese kana
 Na dialect, a Sino-Tibetan variety of India
 Na language (Narua), a Sino-Tibetan language of Yunnan, China
 Nauruan language (ISO code: na)

Organizations
 Narcotics Anonymous (NA), a twelve-step program that focuses on recovery from drug addiction
 National Alliance (Latvia), a Latvian political party
 National Alliance (Netherlands), a former Dutch political party
 National Association (disambiguation)
 National Association of Professional Base Ball Players, the first professional baseball league
 Nepali Army, the land military force of Nepal
 Neurotics Anonymous (N/A), a program for recovery from mental and emotional illness

Other uses
 .na, the top-level domain for Namibia
 N/A, meaning not applicable, not available, or no answer
 N.A., the official designation of federally chartered banks in the United States
 Mosuo or Na, an ethnic group in China near Tibet
 Na people, an ethnic group in India
 National Archives, the archives of a country

See also
 Nå (disambiguation)
 Na Na (disambiguation)
 Na Na Na (disambiguation)